Eedris Turayo Abdulkareem Ajenifuja (born December 24, 1974), popularly known as Eedris Abdulkareem, is a Nigerian hip hop, R n B and Afrobeat artist, songwriter and singer. He was the lead rapper of the defunct Nigerian hip hop boy band The Remedies.

Born Eedris Turayo Abdulkareem Ajenifuja to a polygamous family in Kano, Nigeria, his father was from Ilesha, Osun State, and his mother was from Ogun State, all in the South Western part of Nigeria, but he adopted Kano State as his state of origin. He lost his father at the age of 2 and eight of his elder siblings as time went by.

Career
Abdulkareem formed and performed with the hip-hop band The Remedies from 1997 until they split up in 2002. He continued as a solo artiste and released his first solo album, P.A.S.S. ("Pains And Stress = Success"), in 2002. One of the hits in the collection titled "Wackawickee MC's" criticized Tony Tetuila, Plantashun Boiz and Double X Posse for their unprofessionalism and troubleshooting antics. Later the same year, he released an album titled Mr. Lecturer. Its title track attacked students in Nigerian colleges and universities receiving higher grades in exchange for money and sex, as well as exposing lecturers who perpetrate these acts.

In 2004, Abdulkareem released his third album, Jaga Jaga, a Yoruba term for "shambles", declaiming corruption and suffering in Nigeria. The title track was banned from radio by President Olusegun Obasanjo, but continued to be played in nightclubs and spots all over the country, and became a sort of underground Nigerian national anthem. The album cover was by the renowned artist Lemi Ghariokwu, known for creating many album covers for Fela Kuti.

In November 2005, Abdulkareem launched his own record label, Lakreem Entertainment, and released his fourth studio album, "Letter to Mr. President. The album's title track addressed Obasanjo's criticisms of "Jaga Jaga"; the album also included "Flash Up Unu Lighter", a tribute to Obasanjo's wife, Stella, who died while undergoing surgery in Spain, as well as the victims of the Bellview Airlines crash in October 2005.

In The King is Back album of 2007, Eedris chronicled his travails in the hands of Obasanjo's government and industry dealers and concert promoters who blacklisted him for standing up for the truth in "Koleyewon" and other songs.

He followed that up with Unfinished Business in 2010.

He released a sequel to "Jaga Jaga" in January 2012 during the Occupy Nigeria protest against the lifting of fuel subsidies.

He has also performed on tracks by other artists including "Bad Guy Baller" featuring Mode 9 and VTEK, Klever J's "Igborotidaru" Oba Mmega and Cecil's "I am Afrika".

Known as a social crusader and rights activist in Nigeria, noted for using his music to make his voice heard loud and clear, Abdulkareem released his sixth studio album titled Nothing but the Truth in 2020.

The 20 track album takes a swipe at the ever recurring bad governance and social ills in Nigeria.

With a plethora of top Nigerian music acts including Dede Mabiaku, Sound Sultan, Ruggedman, Olamide, Myke Pam, Adex Artquake and Jazzman Olofin, the album Nothing but the Truth can be described as a collector's item, with one of the hit tracks "Country Hard" triggering a nationwide social media challenge frenzy on Twitter, Instagram and Facebook.

In the ten years break between his last studio album and Nothing but the Truth in 2020, he released a number of singles that treated divergent topical issues in Nigerian political and social life. He featured artistes like Femi Kuti in the song "Tribute to Fela", Fatai Rolling Dollars in "Wonkere", Vector in "Shekere", DJ Jimmy Jatt in "Onile" and Konga in "Trouble Dey Sleep".

Recently, a viral radio interview granted by the former G-Unit member and American recording artiste Young Buck, on what transpired between Abdulkareem and 50 Cent and his crew when they were in Nigeria for a four city concert tagged Star Mega Jams attracted fresh attention to him, seen by the establishment as controversial.

His refusal to bow and lay low at the said concert in 2004 helped in engineering the revolution that changed the finances of the country's music industry and its practitioners for the better.

Within the first quarter of 2021, he released a series of songs, with the visuals by Frizzle and Brizzle making a lot of waves, including the much awaited "Jaga Jaga Reloaded" featuring Raw Nwanne and Madarocker. He followed this with the crowd pleasing single "Oti Get E" in response to a federal minister's rant about his name being added to the list of the inglorious cabal holding down Nigeria's development in the song "Jaga Jaga Reloaded". Both of these singles trended on the social media for weeks and form part of the topical issues in many quarters.

Personal life
Abdulkareem is married to Yetunde and they have children.

Other activities
In 2000, Abdulkareem was among the personalities voted for by the Nigerian public to carry the Olympic torch in a relay through the country.

Discography

Studio albums
P.A.S.S (2002)
Mr. Lecturer (2002)
Jaga Jaga (2004)
Letter to Mr. President (2005)
King Is Back (2007)
Unfinished Business (2010)'Nothing But The Truth (2020)''

Singles
"Jaga Jaga part 2" (2012)
"Wonkere ft Fatai rolling dollar" (2011)
"Sekere" ft Vector (2013)
"Fela ft Femi Kuti" (2013)
"I Go Whoze You ft Vtek" (2013)
"Trouble Dey Sleep" ft Konga (2016)
"Jaga Jaga Reloaded" (2021)
"Oti Get E" (2021)

References

Living people
End SARS activists
People from Osun
Yoruba musicians
Nigerian male rappers
Musicians from Kano
Nigerian hip hop singers
1974 births